Shah Qasem (also Romanized as Shāh Qāsem; also known as Sheykh Qāsem) is a village in Vahdatiyeh Rural District, Sadabad District, Dashtestan County, Bushehr Province, Iran. At the 2006 census, its population was 55, in 9 families.

References 

Populated places in Dashtestan County